Francis Perrin may refer to:

 Francis Perrin (actor) (born 1947), French actor, screenwriter and director
 Francis Perrin (physicist) (1901–1992), French physicist

See also 
 Perrin (disambiguation)